Teck Ghee MRT station is a future underground Mass Rapid Transit station on the Cross Island line located on the boundary of Ang Mo Kio and Bishan planning areas, Singapore. It will be located underneath Ang Mo Kio Avenue 6, between the junctions of Ang Mo Kio Street 31 and Ang Mo Kio Avenue 1.

The station is in the vicinity of residential estates in Ang Mo Kio and Bishan North, and community amenities such as Bishan-Ang Mo Kio Park and Ang Mo Kio Secondary School.

History
On 25 January 2019, LTA announced that Teck Ghee station would be part of the proposed Cross Island line (CRL). The station will be constructed as part of Phase 1, consisting of 12 stations between Aviation Park and Bright Hill, and is expected to be completed in 2030.

Contract N109A, which encompasses the design and construction of Teck Ghee station box, was awarded to Shanghai Tunnel Engineering Co (Singapore) at a sum of S$615.9 million in January 2019. Construction started in 2019, with completion in 2026. Contract N107A also includes the design and construction of a section of North South Corridor tunnel between Sin Ming Avenue and Ang Mo Kio Avenue 3, and relevant commuter facilities. As Teck Ghee station will be superimposed with the North South Corridor and surface road, the station box will be constructed initially, and a subsequent contract will be awarded to complete the station.

 
 

Initially expected to open in 2029, the restrictions on construction works due to the COVID-19 pandemic has led to delays, and the date was pushed to 2030.

References

Proposed railway stations in Singapore
Mass Rapid Transit (Singapore) stations
Railway stations scheduled to open in 2030